Moncrieff may refer to:

Family name Moncreiff
 Baron Moncreiff, title in the peerage of the U.K.
 James Moncreiff, 1st Baron Moncreiff
 Henry Moncreiff, 2nd Baron Moncreiff
 Francis Moncreiff (bishop) (1906-1984) Anglican bishop
 Moncreiffe baronets, three baronetcies

Family name Moncrieff
 Alexander Bain Moncrieff, Irish-Australian engineer
 Alexander Moncrieff, Lord Moncrieff, Scottish judge
 Colonel Sir Alexander Moncrieff, Victorian military engineer responsible for the concept of the disappearing gun
 Robert Hope Moncrieff, author
 Chris Moncrieff (1931–2019), British journalist
 Gladys Moncrieff (1892–1976), Australian singer
 John J. Moncrieff (1866–1939), Canadian newspaper editor and conductor
 Lieutenant John Robert Moncrieff (1899–1928), a New Zealand aviator: Moncrieff and Hood disappearance attempt to cross Tasman strait
 Karen Moncrieff, American film director
 Michael Moncrieff, Australian rules footballer
 Perrine Millais Moncrieff (1893–1979), New Zealand author, ornithologist and conservationist
 Seán Moncrieff, Irish writer, journalist and television presenter
 Moncrieff, his radio show on Newstalk
 Good Grief Moncrieff!, his chat show on RTÉ
 William Thomas Moncrieff (1794–1857), English dramatist

Family name Scott Moncrieff
 Charles Kenneth Scott Moncrieff (1889–1930), Scottish writer and translator, famous for Remembrance of Things Past
 Colonel Sir Colin Scott-Moncrieff (1836–1918), British engineer who reorganised the irrigation system of Egypt
 Major General Sir George Kenneth Scott-Moncrieff (1855–1924), Scottish soldier and engineer
 George Scott-Moncrieff (1910–1974), Scottish author
 Robert Scott Moncrieff (1793–1869), British illustrator

Family name Wellwood Moncreiff
 Sir Henry Wellwood-Moncreiff, 10th Baronet (1809-1885), minister of the Free Church of Scotland
 Sir James Wellwood Moncreiff, 9th Baronet (1776-1851), lawyer and judge

Fictional character
 Algernon Moncrieff, one of the main characters in Oscar Wilde's play, The Importance of Being Earnest.

Other uses
 Division of Moncrieff, electoral division in Queensland, Australia
 Moncrieff, Australian Capital Territory, planned suburb of Canberra, Australia
 Moncrieff Bay, a bay in South Australia
 Moncrieff v Jamieson [2007] Scottish property law case

See also
Moncreiffe (disambiguation)
Moncrief (surname)